Ostrowski (feminine: Ostrowska; plural: Ostrowscy) is a surname of Polish-language origin. The original name may have indicated someone who hailed from the Russian city of Ostrov. It is related to a number of surnames in other languages.

Related surnames

People
 Adam Ostrowski (born 1980), Polish rapper better known as O.S.T.R.
 Alexander Ostrowski (1893–1986), German-Swiss mathematician
 Antoni Jan Ostrowski (1782–1845), Polish nobleman and military figure
 Cezary Ostrowski (born 1962), Polish composer
 Chet Ostrowski (1930–2001), American football player
 Frank Ostrowski (1960–2011), German programmer
 Ilona Ostrowska (born 1974), Polish actress
 Jadwiga Ostrowska-Czubenko (born 1949), Polish chemist
 Jan Ostrowski (born 1999), Luxembourgian footballer
 Krzysztof Ostrowski (born 1982), Polish footballer
 Małgorzata Ostrowska (born 1958), Polish politician
 Marek Ostrowski (1959–2017), Polish footballer
 Otto Ostrowski (1883-1963), German politician
 Phil Ostrowski (born 1975), American football player
 Radasłaŭ Astroŭski (1887–1976), Belarusian political activist
 Ryszard Ostrowski (born 1961), Polish middle distance runner
 Stéphane Ostrowski (born 1962), French basketball player
 Tomasz Adam Ostrowski (1735–1817), Polish nobleman
 Władysław Ostrowski (1790–1869), Polish politician
  (1933–20190, Polish brigadier general; see

Other
Ostrowski Prize, mathematics award
Ostrowski's theorem, mathematical theorem
Two counties in Poland with the native name powiat ostrowski:
 Ostrów Mazowiecka County
 Ostrów Wielkopolski County

See also
 
 
 Ostrovsky (disambiguation)

Polish-language surnames